Proboscina is a genus of bryozoans belonging to the family Oncousoeciidae.

The genus has almost cosmopolitan distribution.

Species:

Proboscina admota 
Proboscina alternata 
Proboscina alternata 
Proboscina anceps 
Proboscina angula 
Proboscina angustiramae 
Proboscina anomala 
Proboscina bifurcata 
Proboscina bohemica 
Proboscina boryi 
Proboscina celsa 
Proboscina clavatiramosa 
Proboscina clavatula 
Proboscina coapta 
Proboscina colubra 
Proboscina compacta 
Proboscina concava 
Proboscina confluens 
Proboscina conveniens 
Proboscina cornigera 
Proboscina cottreaui 
Proboscina cranei 
Proboscina crassa 
Proboscina crassitubae 
Proboscina cunningtoni 
Proboscina denticulata 
Proboscina desoudini 
Proboscina divergens 
Proboscina dutertrei 
Proboscina echinata 
Proboscina elegans 
Proboscina erecta 
Proboscina erucaeformis 
Proboscina exigua 
Proboscina expansa 
Proboscina expatiata 
Proboscina fascicularis 
Proboscina fasciculata 
Proboscina fecunda 
Proboscina fimbriata 
Proboscina fragilis 
Proboscina francorum 
Proboscina geminata 
Proboscina gracilis 
Proboscina hamzai 
Proboscina hennigi 
Proboscina horrida 
Proboscina hunstantonensis 
Proboscina idmoneoides 
Proboscina incrassata 
Proboscina indivisa 
Proboscina ingentis 
Proboscina inornata 
Proboscina interjecta 
Proboscina jaccardi 
Proboscina japonica 
Proboscina junctitubae 
Proboscina khvalynskensis 
Proboscina laevigata 
Proboscina lamellifera 
Proboscina lateralis 
Proboscina latifolia 
Proboscina latobrevis 
Proboscina laxa 
Proboscina lecointrei 
Proboscina lesurensis 
Proboscina liassica 
Proboscina linearis 
Proboscina magniramosa 
Proboscina mesleri 
Proboscina michelini 
Proboscina microstoma 
Proboscina minnesotensis 
Proboscina minuscula 
Proboscina morinica 
Proboscina mutabilis 
Proboscina obscura 
Proboscina orbis 
Proboscina parasitica 
Proboscina parca 
Proboscina parviangulata 
Proboscina procera 
Proboscina projecta 
Proboscina prominens 
Proboscina protracta 
Proboscina punctatella 
Proboscina pustulosa 
Proboscina radians 
Proboscina ramea 
Proboscina rectalinea 
Proboscina robusta 
Proboscina romeroi 
Proboscina rugosa 
Proboscina rugulosa 
Proboscina serpulaeformis 
Proboscina sigmata 
Proboscina striata 
Proboscina striata 
Proboscina striatula 
Proboscina subechinata 
Proboscina subincrassata 
Proboscina taeniaplana 
Proboscina truncata 
Proboscina tubigera 
Proboscina tumulosa 
Proboscina undulata 
Proboscina variabilis 
Proboscina watersi 
Proboscina ziczac

References

Bryozoan genera